Berwick Power Station was a small coal-fired power station situated at the mouth of the River Tweed, at Berwick-upon-Tweed in Northumberland, North East England.

In the early 1920s the Berwick-upon-Tweed electricity undertaking was operated as part of the Urban Electric Supply Company Limited. The latter company operated electricity undertakings in Caterham, Cambourne, Dartmouth & Kingswear, Glossop, Godalming, Grantham, Illogan, Newbury, Newton Abbot, Redruth, Stamford, Weybridge and Woking.

In 1923 the plant at Berwick-upon-Tweed comprised three 90 kW and one 200 kW reciprocating engines driving electricity generators. The machines were supplied with up to 22,000 lb/hr (9,979 kg/hr) of steam. The generators operated at 500 Volts and supplied Direct Current at 240 and 480 Volts to consumers. In 1923 the plant generated 539.447 GWh, the maximum load was 330 MW and there were 1,673 connections on the system. The undertaking sold 423,000 kWh which generated an income of £10,338. After deduction of expense there was a profit of £5,083.

The station was constructed in the 1930s to generate electricity for the town. The station's main building, which consisted of a boiler house and turbine hall, stood at two stories tall. The station was designed to fit in with the town walls, and so constructed in stone. The main building was a triple gabled building, with irregular windows. It had frontage onto the river for easy access to condensing water and coal delivery.

After ceasing to generate electricity in the 1960s, the generating equipment was removed and the building was used as a storehouse. The building was eventually demolished in the late 1990s.

References

Power stations in North East England
Buildings and structures in Northumberland
Demolished power stations in the United Kingdom